Welington Silva Morais (born 6 September 1996) is a Brazilian track and field athlete who specialises in the shot put. He was the gold medallist at the 2021 South American Championships and the silver medallist at the 2022 Ibero-American Championships.

Early years
Welington Silva Morais was born in Imperatriz, Maranhão on 6 September 1996. He began training in athletics in 2010 at the suggestion of a teacher who observed him playing dodgeball. Morais won some local titles before moving to the city of Londrina to continue his training. He saw a rapid improvement in his results, winning the silver medal in the javelin throw (700 g) at the 2012 South American Youth Championships in Argentina. The following year he won a gold medal in the shot put event at the Jogos Escolares da Juventude (Juvenile School Games); his mother surprised him by travelling to the city of Belém to see him compete for the first time.

Career
After settling on the shot put as his discipline, Morais captured the silver medal at the 2015 South American Junior Championships in Ecuador. He also competed at the Pan American Junior Championships two months later in Canada, though he did not medal. In 2018, Morais won a bronze medal at the Troféu Brasil de Atletismo by reaching 19.37 m. Two weeks later he won the 2018 South American U23 Championships with a personal best throw of 19.85 m, coming within 7 centimetres of the championship record.

In mid-2019, Morais competed at both the Summer Universiade in Italy and the Pan American Games in Peru, though he failed to reach the podium at either. However, that September, he repeated as a bronze medallist at the Troféu Brasil de Atletismo before capturing the Brazilian university title. Morais followed this up with a silver-medal performance at the 2020 Troféu Brasil de Atletismo, recording a throw of 19.43 m while Darlan Romani captured his ninth consecutive national title.

On 26 March 2021, Morais threw 20.28 m for a first-place finish at the Reynaldo Berto Gorno South American Grand Prix in Uruguay. It was the first time he surpassed the 20-metre mark and was the second-farthest throw ever by a Brazilian, behind only Darlan Romani's 22.61 m. Morais then won the gold medal at the 2021 South American Championships in Ecuador with a throw of 19.87 m, though he failed to get onto the podium at the national championships after finishing in fourth place.

Morais improved to 20.60 m for a third-place finish at the Torneio Internacional de Atletismo São Paulo in April 2022. He won the silver medal at the Ibero-American Championships in Spain the following month. He achieved a new personal best mark of 20.78 m but once again finished behind Darlan Romani, who recorded a championship record throw of 21.70 m.

Achievements
All information taken from World Athletics profile.

Personal bests

International competitions

National titles
National University Championships
Shot put: 2019

National U23 Championships
Shot put: 2018

National Junior Championships
Shot put (6 kg): 2015

National U18 Championships
Javelin throw (700 g): 2012

References

External links
 

Living people
1996 births
Brazilian male shot putters
South American Championships in Athletics winners
Athletes (track and field) at the 2019 Pan American Games
Competitors at the 2019 Summer Universiade
Sportspeople from Maranhão
People from Imperatriz
21st-century Brazilian people